Max Hodge (February 12, 1916 – August 17, 2007) was an American television writer who worked on shows including The Girl From U.N.C.L.E., CHiPS and Mission: Impossible, and is perhaps best known for creating Mr. Freeze for Batman.

Hodge grew up in East Moline, Illinois and Michigan, later graduating from the University of Michigan then enlisting in the Navy during World War II.  He then attended Pasadena Playhouse College of Theater Arts and began his television career in the 1950s as a producer working on industrial shows for Oldsmobile. In his time at University of Michigan- Ann Arbor, Hodge was chief editor of the student magazine the Gargoyle and president of the men's dramatic union, the Mimes.

His writing career spanned the 1960s through the early 1980s, with Hodge writing for Dr. Kildare, The Wild Wild West, Marcus Welby, M.D., Ironside, The Waltons, The Amazing Chan and the Chan Clan in addition to the aforementioned ChiPS, Mission: Impossible, The Girl From U.N.C.L.E. and Batman. He also served as an associate producer on The Girl From U.N.C.L.E.

Hodge is credited for creating Mr. Freeze for the Batman show, having taken the existing Batman comic character Mr. Zero which was created by Bob Kane and modifying elements to him.  Mr. Zero first appeared in Batman #121 in February 1959, but Hodge took the character and introduced the trademark ice suit which he needed to survive, first appearing in the Deep Freeze episode.  Mr. Freeze is addressed once as "Dr. Shimel" by Batman in the episode. In the comics, Freeze's other identity became "Art Shivel" (apparently a mishearing of how he was addressed on "Batman"). His name in the comics was later changed to Victor Fries.

Hodge died August 17, 2007, in Woodland Hills, California.  He was 91 years old. Most of his works, scripts, and related supplemental material(including his script for "Mr.Freeze") were donated to his alma mater and can be found in the Donald Hall Collection of University of Michigan.

Filmography

Films

Television

References

External links
 

1916 births
2007 deaths
University of Michigan alumni
American television writers
American male television writers
People from East Moline, Illinois
Screenwriters from Illinois
20th-century American screenwriters
20th-century American male writers
United States Navy personnel of World War II